Danielle Dube (born March 10, 1976) played for the Canadian National women's ice hockey team from 1994 to 1998 and from 2000 to 2002. She was a late cut from the 1998 and 2002 Canadian Olympic teams.

On December 11, 2002, Danielle Dube became the third female goaltender to start in goal for a professional men's team. Dube was the goalie for the Long Beach Ice Dogs in a loss against the San Diego Gulls. She stopped 12 of 13 shots for the Ice Dogs. In 2008, she had considered approaching the Vancouver Canucks, with hopes of earning a recommendation to play for the ECHL's Victoria Salmon Kings.

On August 26, 2011, she participated in the Longest Ice Hockey Game 4 CF, at Canlan Ice Sports Burnaby 8 Rinks in Burnaby, British Columbia. The goal was to play for the next 10 days as 40 women attempted to set a new Guinness World Record for playing the longest hockey game while also raising funds and awareness for the Canadian Cystic Fibrosis Foundation.

Dube is currently studying at the University of British Columbia. She joined the UBC Thunderbirds women's ice hockey program as a player at the beginning of the 2012-13 Canada West season and helped the team to the greatest turnaround in Canadian Interuniversity Sport history.

Awards and honours
British Columbia Female Athlete of the Year, 1996
UBC Thunderbirds Player of the Game, 2016 USports National Championship Quarterfinals  
2015-16 May Brown Trophy - University of British Columbia Graduating Female Athlete of the Year

Personal
Danielle lives with her two children, son Porter and daughter Camden. When she was eight-and-a-half weeks pregnant with Porter, she played in a Sea-to-Sky Challenge game.

References

1976 births
Living people
Canadian women's ice hockey goaltenders
Ice hockey people from Vancouver
Long Beach Ice Dogs (WCHL) players
University of British Columbia alumni
UBC Thunderbirds ice hockey players